Soorya Daaham is a 1980 Indian Malayalam film,  directed by Mohan. The film stars Sukumari, Shobha, Sukumaran and P. K. Abraham in the lead roles. The film has musical score by G. Devarajan.

Cast
Sukumari
Shobha
Sukumaran
P. K. Abraham
Ravi Menon
Innocent (actor)

Soundtrack
The music was composed by G. Devarajan and the lyrics were written by Bichu Thirumala.

References

External links
 

1980 films
1980s Malayalam-language films